Herstedvester Church is a church in the northwestern outskirts of Albertslund, Albertslund Municipality, Denmark.
The church is dated to around 1100.

References

External links
Official site

Churches in the Diocese of Helsingør
Buildings and structures in Albertslund Municipality
Churches in the Capital Region of Denmark
Lutheran churches converted from Roman Catholicism